Sister Mary Geraldine Tobia (died April 25, 2000 Manhattan) was a social worker who served as co-Director of the Center for Family Life in Sunset Park, Brooklyn. She lived at the center.  When she was 59, Tobia died of cancer at Mount Sinai Hospital (Manhattan).

Biography
She was born and raised in Newark, New Jersey. Her undergraduate degree was from Fordham University in 1967 and she earned two masters degrees from Columbia. The first was in 1976 from Teachers College, Columbia University and in 1995 from Columbia University School of Social Work.

Career
Tobia founded the Center for Family Life in 1978 with Sister Mary Paul Janchill. The agency was the cover story in Time (magazine) on December 30, 1985.

Honors and awards
In 1978, she received the Ecumenical woman of the Year award from from the Brooklyn Division of the Council of Churches of the City of New York.

Tobia was inducted into the Columbia University School of Social Work Hall of Fame.

References

2000 deaths
American social workers
Fordham University alumni
Teachers College, Columbia University alumni
Columbia University School of Social Work alumni
20th-century American nuns
Columbia University School of Social Work Hall of Fame Inductees